Grenoble Internet eXchange or GrenoblIX is the Internet eXchange point (IXP) of Grenoble in Isère and Auvergne – Rhône-Alpes region. GrenoblIX allows to the connected members to exchange the traffic  in order to avoid passing by faraway infrastructures. This Internet eXchange point is managed by the non-profit organization Rezopole, founded in 2001.

GrenoblIX is a GIX-NAP :
 the GIX, to exchange IP packets or peering (the exchange can be done on the level 2– BGP – or on the level 3 by « Routes Servers ») ;
 the NAP (Network Access point), for a market place which allows members to buy or sell Internet transit and/or any layer 2 or IP services and	all the types of Telecommunications services.

Origin 
GrenoblIX, contraction of Grenoble and GIX (Global Internet eXchange), is a name of the Internet eXchange point (IXP) of Grenoble in Isère and Auvergne – Rhône-Alpes region.

GrenoblIX is founded in Grenoble in April 2011 by the non-profit organization Rezopole. It operates two sites : GrenoblIX 1 located in the COGENT datacenter, and GrenoblIX 2 located in the Eolas groupe datacenter. The last site is particular as it is considered as the first eco-friendly datacenter in France.

Functioning 
IXP gives users the capacity to exchange Internet traffic through peering. The members can improve the quality of their bandwidth and avoid additional costs. The IXP is an important factor to develop the local Internet : the members located in the same area can exchange traffic locally instead of passing by faraway infrastructures.

Members 
Any person having an Autonomous System number can be connected to GrenoblIX.

The members connected to IXP NAP are :
 ISP (Internet service provider)
 Internet operators for companies 
 datacenters
 e-commerce websites 
 large private companies 
 large public institutions

Services

Services for members 
GrenoblIX is an IXP/NAP : the IXP to exchange IP packets through peering (the exchange can be done on the level 2 or 3 by « Routes Servers ») ; the NAP (Network Access Point), for the IP transit market which allows to buy or sell Internet transit.
 10/100/1000 Mbs copper links or 1/10Gbit/s fibre 
 Public peering IPv4/IPv6 unicast, IPv4 multicast 
 Télécom Services bought or sold through VLAN, Waves or intra-POP Optical Fibre 
 Network equipment hosting services, recovery port remote hand, port electrical remote reboot
 DNS services
 The inter-IXP gateway services (Route Serveurs) : peering level 3 
 ROA (Route Origin Authorizations), RPKI
GrenoblIX is connected to LyonIX, FranceIX, NicIX, TouIX, TOP-IX, Equinix, etc.

Peering 
In order to peer the members can filter the received routes and choose to announce their prefixes only on the certain Internet eXchange points in the whole BGP community. The IXP allows to the members to peer with the other members in France or abroad.

Partners 
GrenoblIX is managed by Rezopole and supported by the Grenoble-Alpes Métropole and the Auvergne – Rhône-Alpes region.

See also

Connected articles 
 Internet exchange point
 Peering

References

External links 
 GrenoblIX

Internet service providers of France
Internet exchange points in France
Internet in France
Grenoble